Living River is a 1996 folk album by Rawlins Cross.

Track listing
"Forever Dancing"  – 3:07
"Matter of the Heart"  – 5:07
"Morning After"  – 3:28
"Wild Rose"  – 2:31
"When My Ship Comes In"  – 4:34
"Sad Story..."  – 3:12
"Open Road"  – 3:19
"Little Sara/Jessie's Jig"  – 2:57
"Little of Your Lovin (Goes a Long Long Way)" – 2:25
"Through It All"  – 3:43
"Long Way Home"  – 3:46
"Baby-Oh" – 3:45
"Mairi Nighean Alasdair"  – 3:46

References

1996 albums
Rawlins Cross albums